Edward Knight (born Edward Austen, 10 May 1794 – 5 November 1879) was the nephew of Jane Austen and an English amateur cricketer who played first-class cricket from 1822 to 1828.

He was born in Godmersham, Kent, the eldest son of Edward Austen Knight, who had added the additional surname of Knight in 1812 when he inherited the Chawton House estate from Thomas Knight. Edward junior inherited Chawton on his father's death in 1852. Knight's brothers, George Thomas, Henry and Brook, sons Philip and Wyndham and nephew Gerald Portal all played first-class cricket.

He was a deputy lieutenant and justice of the peace for Hampshire and served as High Sheriff of Hampshire for 1823–24.

He was associated with Kent and MCC He made 13 known appearances in first-class matches, including 3 for the Gentlemen.

He died in 1879 at Alton, Hampshire, and was buried in St Nicholas churchyard, Chawton.

He had married firstly Mary Dorothea, the daughter of Sir Edward Knatchbull, Bt of Mersham Hatch, Kent and secondly Adela, the eldest daughter of John Portal of Hampshire. He had at least seven children.

References

Bibliography
 Arthur Haygarth, Scores & Biographies, Volume 1-2 (1744–1840), Lillywhite, 1862

1794 births
1879 deaths
Austen family
Sportspeople from Dover, Kent
Deputy Lieutenants of Hampshire
High Sheriffs of Hampshire
English cricketers
English cricketers of 1787 to 1825
English cricketers of 1826 to 1863
Kent cricketers
Marylebone Cricket Club cricketers
Gentlemen cricketers
Hampshire cricketers
Jane Austen
Marylebone Cricket Club First 9 with 3 Others cricketers